David Braham is a Caymanian  football manager who currently coaches the Cayman Islands national football team.

References 

Living people
Caymanian football managers
Cayman Islands national football team managers
Year of birth missing (living people)